William Rankin was a Scottish professional football who made over 470 appearances in the Scottish Football League's top division for Motherwell, Cowdenbeath and Clyde, playing at inside right.

He represented the Scottish Football League XI four times and played in two of the annual Home Scots v Anglo-Scots international trial matches, scoring in one, but this did not lead to a full cap for Scotland. In 1921 he was a member of the squad sometimes presented as 'Scotland' which toured North America, but this was organised by the Third Lanark club rather than the Scottish Football Association.

Career statistics

Honours 

Cowdenbeath Hall of Fame

References 

Scottish footballers
Cowdenbeath F.C. players
Scottish Football League players
1895 births
1950 deaths
Footballers from Hamilton, South Lanarkshire
Association football inside forwards
Parkhead F.C. players
Scottish Junior Football Association players
Motherwell F.C. players
Clyde F.C. players
Montrose F.C. players
Scottish expatriate footballers
Scottish expatriate sportspeople in South Africa
Expatriate soccer players in South Africa
Scottish Football League representative players
Burnbank Athletic F.C. players